Andrew Watson (born 14 October 1955) is an Australian cricketer. He played in ten first-class matches for South Australia between 1985 and 1987.

See also
 List of South Australian representative cricketers

References

External links
 

1955 births
Living people
Australian cricketers
South Australia cricketers
Cricketers from Adelaide